Johnson David Nana Yeboah (born 4 June 1995) is a Ghanaian professional footballer who plays as a forward for Italian Serie D club Polisportiva Santa Maria 1936 Castellabate.

He previously played for Roccella, Ercolanese, Gelbison Cilento, Taranto, Turris, US Catanzaro  and Savoia.

Biography
Born in Accra, Ghana, at 17 years old he was selected to attend a trial out in Italy at S.S. Juve Stabia through the special invitation of FIFA agent Oliver Arthur. in 2013.

Club career

Savoia
After the trial period,  he first featured in the youth ranks until eventually making an appearance with the senior team of Savoia club. The striker signed his first professional contract at Savoia club on a year-long deal in January 2014.

Catanzaro
On the 24th of August 2014, Johnson sign in Serie C for the US Catanzaro to end the 2014/2015 league campaign

Turris
Johnson agreed personal terms at Turris in the second half of 2014–15 season again on 31 August 2015

Taranto
In January 2015, Johnson signed at fellow Lega Pro side Taranto for half of the 2015/2016-seasons. During his spell there, the attacker played 25 league matches, scoring 9 goals.

Gelbison
On July 15, 2016, he left Taranto permanently to join newly promoted Serie D side Gelbison Cilento.

Ercolano
Yeboah moved at the end of 2016–2017 season. He joined ASD Roccella on a free transfer.

Roccella
In the 2017-18 summer Johnson join ASD Roccella after agreeing to a short deal.

Messina
On 7 December 2017 Yeboah was signed by Serie D club Messina. He was assigned number 9 shirt.

Mantova
On 20 July 2018, he signed with Serie D club Mantova.

Chieri
In July 2019, he signed with the Italian Serie D side Chieri.

Fidelis Andria
On 11 December 2019, he signed with the Italian Serie D side Fidelis Andria.

Aprilia
In January 2020, after six months as a free agent he signed with Serie D side Aprilia.

Hamrun Spartans
After just one month in February 2020 he joined Maltese side Hamrun.

References

External links
 
 
 

1995 births
Living people
Ghanaian footballers
Association football forwards
U.S. Savoia 1908 players
U.S. Catanzaro 1929 players
S.S. Turris Calcio players
Taranto F.C. 1927 players
A.C.R. Messina players
Mantova 1911 players
A.S.D. Calcio Chieri 1955 players
S.S. Fidelis Andria 1928 players
F.C. Aprilia Racing Club players
Ħamrun Spartans F.C. players
Serie C players
Serie D players
Ghanaian expatriate footballers
Ghanaian expatriate sportspeople in Italy
Ghanaian expatriate sportspeople in Malta
Expatriate footballers in Italy
Expatriate footballers in Malta
Footballers from Accra